General Sir Charles John Waters,  (born 2 September 1935) is a retired British Army officer who served as Commander-in-Chief, Land Forces from 1990 to 1993.

Army career
Educated at Oundle School, John Waters was commissioned into the Gloucestershire Regiment in February 1956. He was made Commanding Officer of 1st Bn Gloucestershire Regiment in 1975. He was appointed Commander of 3rd Infantry Brigade in 1979, Deputy Commander of Land Forces in the Falklands during the Falklands War in 1982 and General Officer Commanding 4th Armoured Division in 1983. He went on to be Commandant of the Staff College, Camberley in 1986, General Officer Commanding Northern Ireland in 1988 and Commander in Chief, UK Land Forces in 1990. Finally he was made Deputy Supreme Allied Commander Europe from 1993 until 1994 when he retired.

Later career
In retirement Waters has been Deputy Chairman of the National Army Museum and he was also the Honorary Colonel of the Royal Wessex Yeomanry from 1992 to 1997.

References

|-

|-
 

|-
 

|-
 

Living people
1935 births
British Army generals
Knights Grand Cross of the Order of the Bath
Commanders of the Order of the British Empire
People educated at Oundle School
British military personnel of the Cyprus Emergency
Gloucestershire Regiment officers
British Army personnel of the Falklands War
British military personnel of The Troubles (Northern Ireland)
NATO military personnel
Commandants of the Staff College, Camberley